Maximilian Schachmann (born 9 January 1994) is a German cyclist, who currently rides for UCI WorldTeam .

In 2012, he was nominated Germany's 'Cyclist of the Year'. He rode in the 2018 Giro d'Italia, where he won stage 18.

Early life
Schachmann was born in Berlin and grew up on the outskirts of the city.

Career

2017–2018: Quick-Step Floors
He had to end his season early after a crash on stage 5 of the Tour de Pologne.

In 2018, Schachmann had a break-out season. After an eighth-place finish at the Flèche Wallonne, he went to his first Grand Tour, starting the 2018 Giro d'Italia. Here, he won the stage to Prato Nevoso. He added a bronze medal in the time trial at the UEC European Road Championships to his record as well as a stage win and third overall at the Deutschland Tour.

2019–present: Bora–Hansgrohe

2019

For 2019, Schachmann moved to German squad . In March, he won a stage of the Volta a Catalunya. At the Tour of the Basque Country, Schachmann won the stage-one time trial to take the overall lead, before securing two more stage wins on stages 3 and 4. He then competed in the Ardennes classics, placing fifth at both the Amstel Gold Race and the Flèche Wallonne and then claimed third place at Liège–Bastogne–Liège.

In July 2019, he was named in the startlist for the 2019 Tour de France. During the stage-13 time trial, he was on his way to post a good time, when he crashed near the end of the course. While he finished the stage, he was later diagnosed with multiple fractures to his hand and had to abandon the Tour.

2020
At the beginning of the 2020 season, Schachmann placed second to Remco Evenepoel at the Volta ao Algarve. In March 2020, Schachmann won Paris–Nice in an edition shortened by one stage due to the COVID-19 pandemic. He won the first stage and then held on to an eventual lead of 18 seconds over Tiesj Benoot to become the fifth German winner of the event, and the first since Tony Martin in 2011.

Schachmann continued in good form following the return to racing in August, taking third place at Strade Bianche. At Il Lombardia, he suffered an accident when a car entered the race course  from the finish. He continued to the finish, where he placed seventh, but fractured his collarbone in the incident. Despite the incident, Schachmann was announced as part of 's Tour de France octet.

2021
In June 2021, he won the German National Road Race Championships.

Major results

2011
 2nd Road race, National Junior Road Championships
2012
 3rd  Time trial, UCI Junior Road World Championships
 9th Time trial, UEC European Junior Road Championships
2013
 9th Time trial, UEC European Under-23 Road Championships
2014
 2nd Time trial, National Under-23 Road Championships
 5th Time trial, UCI Under-23 Road World Championships
 5th Time trial, UEC European Under-23 Road Championships
2015
 2nd  Time trial, UCI Under-23 Road World Championships
 3rd  Time trial, UEC European Under-23 Road Championships
 8th Overall Tour de Berlin
2016
 1st  Time trial, National Under-23 Road Championships
 1st  Overall Tour Alsace
1st  Young rider classification
1st Stage 3
 2nd  Time trial, UCI Under-23 Road World Championships
 2nd Overall Tour de Berlin
 3rd Overall Le Triptyque des Monts et Châteaux
 7th Overall Giro della Valle d'Aosta
1st Stage 3
2017
 National Road Championships
4th Time trial
5th Road race
 4th Overall Ster ZLM Toer
 10th Le Samyn
2018
 1st  Team time trial, UCI Road World Championships
 Giro d'Italia
1st Stage 18
Held  after Stages 1–5
 1st Stage 6 Volta a Catalunya
 2nd Classic de l'Ardèche
 3rd  Time trial, UEC European Road Championships
 3rd Overall Deutschland Tour
1st Stage 2
 4th Time trial, National Road Championships
 4th Overall BinckBank Tour
 7th Overall Volta ao Algarve
 8th La Flèche Wallonne
2019
 1st  Road race, National Road Championships
 1st GP Industria & Artigianato di Larciano
 1st Stage 5 Volta a Catalunya
 3rd Liège–Bastogne–Liège
 5th Amstel Gold Race
 5th La Flèche Wallonne
 10th Overall Tour of the Basque Country
1st  Points classification
1st Stages 1 (ITT), 3 & 4
 10th Overall Tour of California
2020
 1st  Overall Paris–Nice
1st Stage 1
 2nd Overall Volta ao Algarve
 3rd Strade Bianche
 7th Giro di Lombardia
 9th Road race, UCI Road World Championships
  Combativity award Stage 13 Tour de France
2021
 1st  Road race, National Road Championships
 1st  Overall Paris–Nice
 3rd Amstel Gold Race
 4th Overall Tour de Suisse
 9th Liège–Bastogne–Liège
 10th Road race, Olympic Games
 10th La Flèche Wallonne
2022
 10th Overall Tour de Suisse

General classification results timeline

Classics results timeline

References

External links

AWT Greenway Profile

1994 births
Living people
German male cyclists
German Giro d'Italia stage winners
Cyclists from Berlin
Olympic cyclists of Germany
Cyclists at the 2020 Summer Olympics
21st-century German people